The 1937 South American Championships in Athletics  were held in São Paulo, Brazil between 27 and 30 May.

Medal summary

Men's events

Medal table

External links
 Men Results – GBR Athletics
 Women Results – GBR Athletics

S
South American Championships in Athletics
A
International athletics competitions hosted by Brazil
1937 in South American sport
1937 in Brazilian sport